Smoking in Sweden is at a very low prevalence; only 6% of the Swedish population (age 16-84) smoked daily in 2021. The prevalence among women has been higher for many years, but is now the same as for men. Around 5% smoke occasionally. Smoking has been banned in all bars and restaurants since May 2005. A majority of Swedes supported the introduction of the ban. In 2019 the ban was extended to also include outdoor seating in bars and restaurants as well as public places such as playgrounds, bus stops and train stations. Sweden was the only European country to achieve the WHO goal of less than 20% daily smoking prevalence among adults by year 2000. Sweden has a high level of use of smokeless tobacco, specifically a moist snuff product called 'snus', which some Swedes have used as a replacement for smoking.

References

Sweden
Health in Sweden
Politics of Sweden
Swedish culture
Drugs in Sweden
Tobacco in Sweden